Hakan Çakıl (born 23 September 1964, in Ankara) is a Turkish diplomat and former ambassador of Turkey to Lebanon.

Life and career
He attended Middle East Technical University where he received a bachelor's degree in Sociology.  He started his career at Turkish Ministry of Foreign Affairs in 1990. He was the undersecretary in Turkish Embassy to Northern Cyprus between 2009 and 2011. He held the position of principal consultant for Cyprus Affairs in the Ministry of Foreign Affairs from 2011 to 2015. Later, he became the ambassador of Turkey to Nigeria and stayed in Abuja, Nigeria between 2015 and 2018. He was the ambassador of Turkey to Lebanon from 4 July 2018 until 28 February 2021.

References 

1964 births
Living people
Ambassadors of Turkey to Lebanon